Zhang Jinmei is a Chinese sprint canoer who competed in the mid-2000s. She won a bronze medal in the K-4 1000 m event at the 2006 ICF Canoe Sprint World Championships in Szeged, Hungary.

References

Chinese female canoeists
Living people
Year of birth missing (living people)
ICF Canoe Sprint World Championships medalists in kayak